Rave is a board game that was created by WOW Enterprises in 1991. The game is based on the subcultural dance movement of the early 1990s.

The game was created by Patrick Treloar (MD of Wow Enterprises) and designed by The Style Bandits (amongst others) It contains a section designed by Jamie Hewlett of Gorillaz and Tank Girl fame. It went on to sell over 20,000 copies until it was withdrawn from the shelves by WH Smith when the store was made aware of its overtly adult content.

The idea of the game was to drive around looking for fliers and energi [sic] tablets. Once the player had accumulated enough energi tablets, they could then proceed to their rave and dance, until they collected all three sections of the WOW Triptych.

WOW Enterprises are now engaged in the design and creation of an MMORPG based around the game.

See also
 Rave
 Church of the Subgenius
 Dance Music

External links
 Images of the game at Hyperreal.org
 Rave details and pictures at Fantazia
 Patrick Treloar's Home Page and information
 

Board games introduced in 1991
Roll-and-move board games